Mary Eleanor Clark (April 28, 1927, San Francisco – December 11, 2019, Veneta, Oregon) was an American biologist. She was named the first National Professor of the Year by the Council for Advancement and Support of Education. In 1978, she was named a Fellow of the American Association for the Advancement of Science.

Life 
At the University California, Berkeley, Clark earned her Bachelor in Biochemistry, 1949; Master of Arts in Biology, 1951; and Doctor of Philosophy, 1960. She went on to become a biology professor at San Diego State University, George Mason University, Denison University and the University of Montevallo. She was named National Professor of Year by the Council Advancement and Support Education, 1981.

In addition, she was an accomplished artist and musician and was known for her love of the outdoors.

Selected works 
 Contemporary Biology
 Ariadne’s Thread
 In Search of Human Nature

References

External links 
 Mary E. Clark with biology students

1927 births
2019 deaths
20th-century American biologists
American women biologists
Scientists from San Francisco
University of California, Berkeley alumni
San Diego State University faculty
George Mason University faculty
Denison University faculty
University of Montevallo faculty
Fellows of the American Association for the Advancement of Science
20th-century American women scientists